Ek Nai Paheli is a 1984 Hindi-language film directed by K. Balachander, starring Raaj Kumar, Hema Malini, Kamal Haasan, Padmini Kohlapure in the lead roles. It is a remake of the Tamil film Apoorva Raagangal by the same director.

Plot 

Upendranath, a widower, lives a wealthy life. His son Sandeep is a headstrong and stubborn young man. Sandeep leaves his dad's house to make his own life.

He meets a beautiful older woman Bhairavi who is a singer. Love develops between Bhairavi and Sandeep and they plan to marry. Avinash, Bhairavi's long lost boyfriend and father of her teenage daughter Kajri's arrival creates more conflicts. Kajri lives with the much older Upendranath and they plan to marry as well.

What is the fate of Bhairavi and Sandeep, Upendranath and Kajri? Can a man become his own son's son-in-law? And a woman, her own daughter's daughter-in-law?

Cast 
Raaj Kumar as Upendranath
Hema Malini as Bhairavi
Kamal Haasan as Sandeep
Padmini Kolhapure as Kajri
Suresh Oberoi as Avinash
Mehmood as Dr. Suri
Asha Sachdev as Jeet Kumari
Rakesh Bedi as Guest Appearance
Johnny Lever as Guest Appearance

Songs 
The music was composed by Laxmikant–Pyarelal.

References

External links 

1984 films
Films directed by K. Balachander
Hindi remakes of Tamil films
Films scored by Laxmikant–Pyarelal
1980s Hindi-language films
Films with screenplays by K. Balachander